Pteraeolidia is a genus of sea slugs, aeolid nudibranchs, marine gastropod molluscs in the family Facelinidae.

Species
Species within the genus Pteraeolidia include:
 Pteraeolidia annulata Eliot, 1910 - synonym: Indocratena annulata (Eliot, 1910)
 Pteraeolidia ianthina (Angas, 1864) - synonyms: Flabellina ianthina Angas, 1864, Flabellina scolopendrella Risbec, 1928
 Pteraeolidia semperi (Bergh, 1870)  - synonym: Flabellina semperi Bergh, 1870

A recent study suggests that there are many species of Pteraeolidia in the Indo-Pacific region.

References

Further reading 
 
 Bergh, L. S. R.  1890.  Die cladohepatischen Nudibranchien.  Zoologische Jahrbücher, Abtheilung für Systematik Geographie und Biologie der Thiere 5:1-75.
 Bergh, L. S. R.  1892.  Malacologische Untersuchungen.  In: Reisen im Archipel der Philippinen von Dr. Carl Gottfried Semper.  Zweiter Theil.  Wissenschaftliche Resultate.  Band 2, Theil 3, Heft 18, pp. 995–1165.
 Bergh, L. S. R.  1905a.  Die Opisthobranchiata der Siboga-Expedition.  Monographie 50, pp. 1–248, pls. 1-20.
 Thiele, J.  1992.  Handbook of Systematic Malacology, part 2 (Gastropoda: Opisthobranchia and Pulmonata).  Scientific editors of Translation: Rüdiger Bieler & Paula M. Mikkelsen.  xiv + 1189 pp.  Smithsonian Institution Libraries & National Science Foundation, Washington, D. C. ; page 748
 Vaught, K.C. (1989). A classification of the living Mollusca. American Malacologists: Melbourne, FL (USA). . XII, 195 pp

Facelinidae